Ramesh Menon is an author, journalist, documentary filmmaker, and corporate trainer.

Early life

Ramesh Menon, is an author, journalist, documentary filmmaker, and corporate trainer. He was born in Bangalore on 18 October 1955. He grew up in Pune. He completed his B.A. (English Lit.) from Nowrosjee Wadia College and completed his B.J. (Bachelor of Journalism) from the University of Poona. He then completed his master's degree in Mass Communication. He completed a Certificate Course in Film Appreciation from Film and Television Institute of India, Pune, and another Certificate Course in Development Journalism from Banaras Hindu University, Varanasi. He is the son of T. Madhavan Menon and Janaki Menon. He is married to Geeta Menon and lives in Noida.

Career
He has 43 years of varied media experience with newspapers, television channels, and the new media. He started as a columnist with Poona Herald in 1977. He was a reporter with The Times of India, associate editor, India Today, executive producer, Business India Television, TV Today, roving editor of rediff.com an advisor at The Energy and Resources Institute where he made documentary films on environmental and social issues and managing editor, India Legal, a weekly dealing with legal issues (www.indialegalonline.com).
Earlier, he freelanced for numerous newspapers, magazines, and websites and writes on development issues for, Reader's Digest, Prevention and many other publications.
He was formerly the Managing Editor, of a weekly magazine India Legal, a politico-legal magazine and Views on News, a media magazine
He was formerly the Editor-in-chief of The Leaflet, a legal website. https://www.theleaflet.in
He is presently Adjunct Faculty at the Symbiosis Institute of Media and Communication, Pune. He also lectures at AJKMCRC, Jamia Millia Islamia, New Delhi and is the Course Director of the Creative Writing Short-term Course at Sri Aurobindo Centre for Arts and Communication, New Delhi.
He has conducted corporate training on soft skills for numerous organisations and companies. Some of them are Airtel, Hewitt, Dockendale Ship Management Pvt. Ltd., Centaur Hotel, WABCO, Dr. Oetker, DS Group, CNN-IBN, NTV, NewsX and rediff.com Bill and Melinda Gates Foundation among many others.

Documentary films

Ramesh Menon has directed and scripted numerous documentaries on social and environmental issues.
 Taj Mahal - Not a love Story (1997) (Directed, Scripted and Produced)
 Climate Change (Directed, Scripted)
 The Slow Poisoning of India (Directed, Scripted)
 A New Dawn in the Himalayas (Directed, Scripted)
 Give us a Life….Please! (Directed, Scripted)

Menon has also scripted the following films:

 Learning to Dream Again: on Joint Forest Management.
 Daughters of the Soil: on how women have to be seen as farmers and not agricultural labourers in India.
 Taj Mahal-Beyond the Love Story: on Pollution in Agra and how livelihoods of the poor cannot be less important than protecting a monument.
 To their credit... : on how poor women with small loans have changed the fortunes of their families.
 Water ignites life and hope: on watershed management.
 Where is my dinner?: deals with hunger and poverty in India
 A New Prescription: on the poor state of women's health in India.
 An Area of Darkness: on the lack of electricity in rural India.

Awards
 Ramnath Goenka Award for Excellence in Journalism. http://archive.indianexpress.com/news/16-stories-that-needed-excellence-and-how-they-got-it/2326/
 Madhavankutty Gold Medal for Excellence English Journalism. https://india.mongabay.com/by/ramesh-menon/

Books

Caste and Communal Timebomb, Golwala Publications, Ahmedabad, 1986: It dealt with the tragedy of caste and communal violence that had torn Gujarat and was co-authored with late Prof. Pravin Sheth, a political scientist,
Whatever the Odds, Harper Collins India, Published in 2011. Deals with the story of K.P. Singh, real estate magnate and chairman, DLF. Is the story of how he rose from being a captain in the Indian army to one of the richest Indians and how a city like Gurgaon was built by him."
Carbon Footprint: Reducing it for a better tomorrow TERI Press, New Delhi, Published in 2014.
Environment Chronicles: The best of Terra Green. Published by TERI in 2012. He authored two chapters: Women as Protectors of Biodiversity and Tainted Tales.  "
Night Sparkle: Fascinating Stories of Indian Lighthouses, Matrix Publishers, New Delhi, Published in 2013, deals with lighthouses and its lightkeepers along the Indian coast from Gujarat to West Bengal.
Modi Demystified: The Making of a Prime Minister, Harper Collins India, Published in 2014 deals with the decade-long rule of Modi in Gujarat, his rise in the BJP and his journey to New Delhi as the Prime Minister in 2014 in a historic election.
The Journey of OP Vaish: Celebrating Life with Gratitude, Orient Publishing, 2015.

External links

 http://www.expressindia.com/ramnath-goenka foundation/2005_winners.html
 http://www.boloji.com/index.cfm?md=Content&sd=Writers&WriterID=1175
 https://web.archive.org/web/20130214071742/http://simc.edu/faculty/ramesh-menon
 https://www.sac.ac.in/creative-writing-courses

References

Living people
1955 births
Indian documentary filmmakers
Journalists from Maharashtra
Banaras Hindu University alumni